Irony of Negro Policeman is a painting created by American artist Jean-Michel Basquiat in 1981. It depicts a black figure as police officer, however, Basquiat found the idea of the "Negro Policeman" specifically ironic.

History 
By 1981, Jean-Michel Basquiat made the transition from street artist to a gallery artist. Basquiat joined the Anina Nosei Gallery in New York, and Nosei provided him with studio space in the basement of her gallery where he created some of his most important artworks such as Irony of a Negro Policeman. The painting sold for $12.6 million at a Phillips Contemporary Art auction in 2012.

Analysis 

The figure in the artwork—a black man dressed in a midnight blue police uniform—represents the totalitarian black mass. The hat that frames the head of the policeman resembles a cage, and represents what Basquiat believes are the constrained independent perceptions of African-Americans at the time, and how constrained the policeman's own perceptions were within white society. Basquiat drew upon his Haitian heritage by painting a hat that resembles the top hat associated with Baron Samedi of the Gede family of lwa, who embody the powers of death in Haitian Vodou.

Race was one of the most important themes in Basquiat's oeuvre. He consistently placed the black figure at the center his artwork because as he stated: "Black people are never really portrayed realistically in...I mean, not even portrayed in modern art enough." However, by titling the artwork "IRONY OF NEGRO PLCEMN" next to the figure, Basquiat is suggesting irony in that the oppressed is wearing the uniform of the oppressor. Author Jana Evans Braziel noted: The elided vowels in the word "policeman" (painted onto the wood panel as "PLCEMN") suggest that the "Negro Policeman" is merely a placement: a position or cog within the machine; as a placement, there can also be a replacement: to the system, he is expendable.

Irony of a Negro Policeman was painted the same year Basquiat created La Hara (1981), a menacing depiction of a white policeman. However the contrast of intimidation are opposites. The black officer in Irony of a Negro Policeman is outlined in white with a mask-like face, symbolizing hypocrisy, whereas La Hara's cryptic message is conveyed with brutal-looking skeleton of a white officer.

Exhibitions 
Irony of a Negro Policeman has been exhibited at major art institutions worldwide, which include:

 Jean-Michel Basquiat at Whitney Museum of American Art in New York, October 1992–February 1993; The Menil Collection in Houston, March–May 1993; Des Moines Art Center in Iowa, May–August 1993; Montgomery Museum of Fine Arts in Alabama, November 1993–January 1994.
 Basquiat at the Brooklyn Museum in New York, March 11–June 2005; Museum of Contemporary Art, Los Angeles, July–October 2005; Museum of Fine Arts, Houston, November 2005–February 2006.
 Basquiat at Fondation Beyeler in Switzerland, May–September 2010; Musée d'Art Moderne de la Ville de Paris, October 2010–January 2011.
 Basquiat's 'Defacement': The Untold Story at Guggenheim Museum in New York, June–November 2019.

See also 

 List of paintings by Jean-Michel Basquiat

References 

Paintings by Jean-Michel Basquiat
1981 paintings
Political art
Black people in art